Anton Kicha (born 1 May 1990) is a Ukrainian professional footballer who plays as a midfielder for Metalurh Zaporizhzhia.

Career
Kicha is a product of two Dnipropetrovsk youth sportive schools. His first trainer was Anatoliy Zyuz.

He made his debut in the Ukrainian Premier League entering as the second-time substitute for FC Illichivets Mariupol in the game against FC Vorskla Poltava on 17 July 2010.

References

External links 

Profile at FFU Official Site (Ukr)

Ukrainian footballers
FC Dnipro-75 Dnipropetrovsk players
FC Mariupol players
FC Oleksandriya players
FC Chornomorets Odesa players
FC Helios Kharkiv players
FC Hirnyk-Sport Horishni Plavni players
FC Mynai players
FC VPK-Ahro Shevchenkivka players
FC Metalurh Donetsk players
Ukrainian Premier League players
Association football midfielders
1990 births
Living people
Ukrainian First League players
Footballers from Dnipro